Ernesto Marcel (23 May 1948 – 29 June 2020) was a Panamanian professional boxer who competed from 1966 to 1974. He held the WBA featherweight title from 1972 to 1974 and challenged for the WBC featherweight title in 1971.

Career
Making his professional debut as a teenager in 1966, Marcel built up a record of 31–3–1, which included a second round knockout of Bernardo Caraballo, who had previously fought Fighting Harada and Éder Jofre for world titles, and a tenth-round technical knockout loss to a young Roberto Durán, the only stoppage defeat of Marcel's career.

On 11 November 1971, Marcel faced WBC featherweight champion Kuniaki Shibata in Matsuyama, Japan, but the fight was scored a draw, meaning Shibata retained his title. Less than a year later, Marcel defeated Antonio Gómez for the WBA featherweight title, and made three successful defences of the crown. He made his fourth and final defence against Alexis Argüello on 16 February 1974, winning a unanimous decision after fifteen rounds. With a record of 40–4–2, Marcel announced his retirement from boxing after the fight, making him one of only a handful of boxers to retire as a reigning world champion.

References

External links 
 

1948 births
2020 deaths
Sportspeople from Colón, Panama
Panamanian male boxers
Bantamweight boxers
Featherweight boxers
World Boxing Association champions
World featherweight boxing champions